The Island is an American survival skills reality television series, hosted by adventurer and survivalist Bear Grylls on NBC, which began airing on May 25, 2015.

Synopsis
Bear Grylls seeks to find out whether a modern American man can survive on a deserted island for one month without the luxuries or the basics of contemporary everyday life. Unlike traditional reality television shows, The Island does not include any prizes, eliminations, or winners.

Production
It is based on the British series The Island with Bear Grylls. The first season has six episodes. In the UK all episodes are available on All 4. In the series' premiere, fourteen men from various occupations and backgrounds are taken to a remote, uninhabited island by Bear Grylls, where they were left completely alone. Filming themselves, the men hunt for food, source water, erect shelter, build community and try to survive using only their strength, determination and know-how. They are equipped with limited tools, a basic medical kit, and a satellite phone for medical emergencies. On August 16, 2016, NBC cancelled The Island after one season.

Cast
Rob Brothers, Stay-at-home Father
Davion Carrillo, Firefighter
Taylor Cole, Radio Producer
Matthew Getz, Embedded Cameraman
Benji Lanpher, Embedded Cameraman
Earnest Marshall, Iraq War Veteran
Dakota Mortensen, Bird Farmer
Jim Murray, Retired Police Chief
Jud Nichols, Criminal Defense Attorney
Dr. Buck Parker M.D., Trauma Surgeon
Michael Rossini, Engineer
Graham Sheldon, Embedded Cameraman
Rick Smith, Embedded Cameraman
Trey Williams, Digital Marketing Manager

Evacuated off the island
 Taylor Cole (medical, episode 1)
 Michael Rossini (medical, episode 2)
 Davion Carrillo (medical, episode 3)
 Earnest Marshall (personal issues episode 4)
 Trey Williams (medical, episode 5)

Episodes

References

External links

2010s American reality television series
2015 American television series debuts
2015 American television series endings
English-language television shows
NBC original programming
American television series based on British television series